Hümaşah Sultan (born 1543) was an Ottoman princess, the daughter of Şehzade Mehmed (1521–1543) and the granddaughter of Sultan Suleiman the Magnificent of the Ottoman Empire, and his favourite consort and legal wife Hurrem Sultan.

Life

Early years
Hümaşah was born in Manisa in 1543, where her father served as sanjakbey. She was his only child. Alderson, in The Structure of Ottoman Dynasty, call her mother "Aya Hatun". Following her father's death in 1543, she was taken under the care of her grandmother and moved to Istanbul. 

Like her cousin Ayşe Sultan, she was reportedly beloved by their grandfather, with whom she kept correspondence. Hümaşah, her cousin, and her aunt Mihrimah Sultan would all imitate the communication style ushered in by her grandmother Hurrem, whose letters to the Sultan are known for their colourfulness, charm, and smoothness. In 1563, she gave her cousin Şehzade Murad (future Sultan Murad III) a concubine that would go on to be Safiye Sultan. 
She is regarded by historian Mustafa Çağatay Uluçay as amongst the most influential women of Suleiman's reign.

Marriages
Hümaşah married three times. Her first husband was Ferhad Pasha. He had previously served as second Kapıcıbaşı. In 1553, he became the Agha of the Janissaries. In 1557-8, he was made the governor of Kastamonu Sanjak, and in 1564, he was made the third vizier. The marriage took place in about 1566/7 in the Old Palace. The then grand vizier, in compliance with the law, walked on foot to the corner of the Old Palace with a scepter in his hand.

Their palace was located in the precincts of the Old Palace  and Bayezid II Mosque. The two together had fours son and five daughters, including Fatma Sultan and Hatice Sultan. Hümaşah was widowed at Ferhad's death on 6 February 1575.

On 25 August 1575, six months after the death of Ferhad Pasha, Hümaşah married Lala Kara Mustafa Pasha. The two together had one son, Sultanzade Abdülbaki Bey. She was widowed at his death on 7 August 1580. After his death, Hümaşah married the governor of Shahrizor Eyalet, Mehmed Pasha, the brother of the grand vizier Damat Ibrahim Pasha. He died in August 1581.

Death
Upon her death, she was buried alongside her father and uncle, Şehzade Cihangir, in Şehzade Mosque. She had a provision made, supported by vakfs, that is, charitable foundations, so that the Quran would be read for the sake of her soul.

Issue
She had four sons and five daughters by her first marriage with Ferhad Paşa:
 Fatma Hanımsultan (1567 — 29 June 1588); the eldest child of Hümaşah Sultan. She was married in 1584 to the sanjakbey of Kastamonu Mehmed Bey (died 1586), from whom she had a son, Hacı Pasha, who served as the beylerbey of Manisa.
 Sultanzade Mustafa Mehmed Bey (1569—1593); sanjakbey of Belgrade, calligrapher. He had a son, Suleiman Bey, who died in 1655.
 Sultanzade Osman Bey (1571—1626); sanjakbey of Bolu.
 Sultanzade Ibrahim Bey; died in 1601. He had a son, Mustafa Pasha, governor of Bosnia, who died in 1636.
 Sultanzade Huseyn Bey
 Hatice Hanımsultan
 Three daughters whose name is unknown

She had a son by her second marriage with Lala Kara Mustafa Pasha:
 Sultanzade Abdülbaki Bey, who married Safiye Hanımsultan, daughter of his mother's cousin Ismihan Sultan (daughter of Sultan Selim II and Nurbanu Sultan)

Annotations

References

Sources
 
 
  
 
 
 
 

1540s births
16th-century Ottoman princesses
People from Manisa